The 2003 Green Bay Packers season was the franchise's 85th season overall and their 83rd in the National Football League.

The Packers won the division on the last play of the season. Needing a win and a Minnesota Vikings loss to clinch the division, the Packers routed the Denver Broncos 31–3, while the Vikings lost 18–17 on a last second touchdown by the 3-12 Arizona Cardinals.

The Packers defeated the Seattle Seahawks in the wild-card round in overtime off an interception return for a touchdown by Al Harris. However, the season finished with an embarrassing overtime loss to the Philadelphia Eagles in the Divisional round of the playoffs after failing to stop the Eagles on 4th and 26, where a defensive stand on the play would have sealed the team a trip to the NFC Championship Game for the first time since 1997 as the Eagles had only one timeout remaining and just over a minute left in regulation.

In the Week 16 Monday night game, Brett Favre threw four touchdowns in a 41–7 win over the Oakland Raiders, one night after his father died of a heart attack.

Offseason 
The Packers were able to add Al Harris to their starting lineup from a trade with Philadelphia. They lost starters Terry Glenn to a trade and Vonnie Holliday to free agency.

NFL draft

Undrafted free agents

Personnel

Staff

Roster

Preseason

Regular season 
The Packers finished the season 10–6 and advanced to the Divisional round of the playoffs.

Game Summaries

Week 1: vs Minnesota Vikings

Week 2: vs Detroit Lions

Week  3: at Arizona Cardinals

Week 4: at Chicago Bears

Week 5: vs Seattle Seahawks

Week 6: vs Kansas City Chiefs

Week 7: at St. Louis Rams

Week 9: at Minnesota Vikings

Week 10: vs Philadelphia Eagles

Week 11: at Tampa Bay Buccaneers

Week 12: vs San Francisco 49ers

Week 13: at Detroit Lions

Week 14: vs Chicago Bears

Week 15: at San Diego Chargers

Week 16: at Oakland Raiders

Week 17: vs Denver Broncos

Addition of Grady Jackson 
On November 5, 2003, the Packers claimed defensive tackle Grady Jackson off waivers from the New Orleans Saints. Jackson helped the Packers allow only 95.38 rushing yards per game over the final 8 games, after allowing over 117 yards per game in the first 8 games. Jackson signed a two-year contract extension on December 29, 2003.

Favre's Monday night performance 

The day before the Week 16 game, Irvin Favre, father of Brett Favre, died suddenly of a heart attack. Favre elected to play and passed for four touchdowns in the first half, and 399 yards in a 41–7 defeat of the Raiders. Afterwards, Favre said, "I knew that my dad would have wanted me to play. I love him so much and I love this game. It's meant a great deal to me, to my dad, to my family, and I didn't expect this kind of performance. But I know he was watching tonight."

Playoffs

vs. Seattle Seahawks 

Packers defensive back Al Harris returned an interception 52 yards for the game-winning touchdown 4:25 in overtime. The game was sent into overtime on Seahawk running back Shaun Alexander's third touchdown of the day. Ahman Green scored two touchdowns for Green Bay, and Bubba Franks caught a 23-yard touchdown in the second quarter. The game is memorable for Seahawks quarterback Matt Hasselbeck's ironic comment after winning the coin toss for the start of overtime, telling the referee "We want the ball and we're going to score." This game remains one of two times in NFL history that an NFL playoff game has ended with a defensive touchdown in OT (the other being the January 10, 2010 Wild Card game between the Arizona Cardinals and the Packers).

Packers quarterback Brett Favre completed 26 of 38 passes for 319 yards and a touchdown.

vs. Philadelphia Eagles 

Ahman Green's franchise postseason record 156 rushing yards was not enough to lift the Packers to victory. Facing fourth down and 26 yards to go, with 1:12 left in the fourth quarter and the Packers leading 17–14, Eagles quarterback Donovan McNabb completed a 28-yard pass to Freddie Mitchell on a famous play now known as "4th and 26". The play set up David Akers' 37-yard field goal to send the game into overtime. In the overtime Favre's deep pass was intercepted, and Akers then kicked a 31-yard field goal, giving the Eagles the victory.

McNabb had a spectacular performance in the game, completing 21 of 39 passes for 248 yards and 2 touchdowns, while also rushing for 107 yards on 11 carries.

Standings

Awards and honors 
 Brett Favre, NFC Leader, Completion Percentage (65.4)
 Brett Favre, NFC Leader, Touchdown Passes (32)

References

External links 
 2003 Packers results and recaps

Green Bay Packers
Green Bay Packers seasons
NFC North championship seasons
Green